Non-abelian or nonabelian may refer to:

 Non-abelian group, in mathematics, a group that is not abelian (commutative)
 Non-abelian gauge theory, in physics, a gauge group that is non-abelian

See also
 Non-abelian gauge transformation, a gauge transformation
 Non-abelian class field theory, in class field theory
 Nonabelian cohomology, a cohomology
 Abelian (disambiguation)